Ptychopariida is a large, heterogeneous order of trilobite containing some of the most primitive species known. The earliest species occurred in the second half of the Lower Cambrian, and the last species did not survive the Ordovician–Silurian extinction event.

Trilobites have facial sutures that run along the margin of the glabella and/or fixigena to the shoulder point where the cephalon meets the thorax. These sutures outline the cranidium, or the main, central part of the head that does not include the librigena (free cheeks). The eyes are medial along the glabella on the suture line (and some species have no eyes). The fossils of the moults of trilobites can often be told from the fossils of the actual animals by whether the librigena are present. (The librigena, or cheek spines, detach during moulting.) In ptychopariids, short bladelike genal spines are often present on the tips of the librigena.

The thorax is large and is typically made up of eight or more segments. The thorax is usually much longer than the pygidium, which is usually small. In some species the pygidium is outlined with a flat border.

The Subclass Librostoma was recently erected to encompass several related orders, including Ptychopariida, Asaphida, Proetida, Harpetida, and possibly Phacopida. These are now known as the "Librostome Orders". Trilobites of the orders Proetida, Harpetida, and of the family Damesellidae were originally placed in Ptychopariida.

Taxonomy

Suborder Olenina
Superfamily Olenoidea
Family Ellipsocephaloididae
Family Olenidae
Superfamily Incertae sedis 
Genus Triarthrus
Suborder Ptychopariina
Superfamily Ellipsocephaloidea
Family Agraulidae
Family Aldonaiidae 
Family Bigotinidae
Family Chengkouiidae
Family Ellipsocephalidae
Family Estaingiidae
Family Palaeolenidae
Family Yunnanocephalidae
Superfamily Ptychoparioidea
Family Acrocephalitidae 
Family Alokistocaridae
Family Antagmidae
Family Asaphiscidae 
Family Atopidae
Family Bolaspididae 
Family Cedariidae 
Family Changshaniidae 
Family Conocoryphidae 
Family Conokephalinidae 
Family Crepicephalidae 
Family Diceratocephalidae 
Family Elviniidae 
Family Eulomidae 
Family Holocephalinidae 
Family Ignotogregatidae 
Family Inouyiidae
Family Isocolidae 
Family Kingstoniidae 
Family Liostracinidae 
Family Llanoaspididae 
Family Lonchocephalidae 
Family Lorenzellidae 
Family Mapaniidae 
Family Marjumiidae 
Family Menomoniidae 
Family Nepeidae 
Family Norwoodiidae 
Family Papyriaspididae 
Family Phylacteridae 
Family Proasaphiscidae 
Family Ptychopariidae 
Family Shumardiidae 
Family Solenopleuridae 
Family Tricrepicephalidae 
Family Utiidae 
Family Wuaniidae 
Superfamily Incertae sedis
Genus Tonopahella
Suborder incertae sedis
Family Avoninidae
Family Catillicephalidae
Family Ityophoridae
Family Plethopeltidae

See also
Cambroproteus
Meniscopsia

References 
 Order Ptychopariida
 A Guide to the Orders of Trilobites By Sam Gon III

 
Trilobite orders
Cambrian first appearances
Late Ordovician extinctions